Amlan Das is an Odia actor mostly viewed in [Bollywood| films]] and advertisements. He is the son of Famous Odia actor Mihir Das. He started his career just after completing his graduation in 2013.

Biography 
Amlan was born as the elder son of Mihir Das and Sangita Das at Cuttack. He completed his schooling and college at DAV school, CDA. Cuttack joined for his graduation in the Sivaji Ganesan Film Institute of SRM Institute of Science and Technology located in Chennai. In 2013 he completed his graduation and started his film career in the movie Target with direction from SK Muralidharan. But his first performance failed to attract a wider audience. He grew in popularity after appearing in Tu Mo Dehara Chhai but later on he failed to impress the Odia viewers with his performance. He failed to increase his popularity and audience attention due to continuous flop movies.

Filmography

References

External links 

Living people
Indian male film actors
Year of birth missing (living people)